A Saintly Switch is a 1999 American made-for-television comedy film directed by Peter Bogdanovich and produced by Walt Disney Entertainment, first exhibited on ABC's The Wonderful World of Disney. The plot revolves around an aging NFL quarterback and his stay-at-home wife switching bodies. The resultant comedy focuses on family values as she has to handle the highly-physical job while he has to handle art classes, bonding with his children, and morning sickness.

Plot
At the film's opening, Dan and Sara Anderson are experiencing marital fallout. According to their preteen children, Clark and Annette, they both underestimate each other's role in the family. When a new position with the Saints takes them to New Orleans, they purchase a dilapidated mansion. Upon arrival, they start fighting worse than ever. The children go up into the attic and discover a book of spells, finding out from their babysitter, the resident voodoo sorceress, that this house once belonged to the most powerful sorceress in the area. Desperate to save their parents marriage, they cast a spell which inadvertently switches their parents' bodies.

The next morning, Dan wakes up in Sara's body, and she vice versa. They try to act like nothing has changed, which means they must do each other's jobs. After managing for about a day or two, still trying to keep the children (who already know what's going on) from finding out, Dan (in Sara's body) goes to the doctor because he (she) is feeling sick and discovers that he (she) is pregnant. The rest of the movie continues in similar fashion: as they live life in the other's body they grow to understand one another.

Thanks to the secret coaching she is receiving from Dan, Sara starts to get better at football. Her nurturing nature leads to her/him implementing the sort of "reward" list and tactics usually expected in a classroom. Surprisingly, this encourages the team so much that they start winning match after match. On the other hand, Dan is learning how to keep house and, though still rather uncomfortable, is rather enjoying his/her pregnancy and getting closer to the children in the process. As time passes, both parents really begin to understand what the other was complaining about, commenting on this to one another and wondering if they'll ever switch back or if they'll be stuck in each other's bodies for the rest of their lives.

When the pregnancy is about nine months along, the Saints come to the final game against the Redskins. If they win, Dan and the team go to the Super Bowl, and Dan would never have to worry about money or moving around again. Exhilarated, he and Sara embrace each other at the table and shout jubilantly at each other. This is heard by the children, who use this opportunity to finally confess all to their parents. They try to undo the spell, but fail. They call the babysitter, who translates that the spell will reverse once its purpose is complete: when their parents truly understand each other, they will be restored to their rightful bodies. However, there is a warning clause that implies that unless they manage to undo the spell before the birth of the baby, it will be permanent.

After the babysitter leaves and the Andersons go to bed, Dan and Sara apologize to each other, then kiss, which turns out to be the necessary act of understanding. The next day is the big match, and Dan's teammates instantly notice the difference in his behavior. While Sara goes into labor, his attempts to motivate his teammates with insults causes them to start fumbling. Clark reminds him to forget his old methods of motivation and revert to the "touchy-feely stuff" Sara used. In the hospital, Sara is puffing, panting, swearing, and ordering the nurses to bring her a TV. Around the time Dan wins the championship game, she finally gives in to nature and gives birth to a son. Later on, Dan is offered another job, but turns it down for his family.

Cast

Background
The film was dedicated to the memory of Dave Waymer by its writer and producer, Sally Hampton, whose experience as an NFL wife (Hampton and Waymer were married in 1981) was the inspiration behind the story. Hampton said she had loosely based the lead characters on their personalities and, ironically, the lead actor, David Alan Grier and Waymer share the same July 1 birthday and Hampton, was born late afternoon of July 29 making her birthday only hours away from the July 30 birthdays of lead actress, Vivica A. Fox and director Peter Bogdanovich. Adding to these coincidences, principal photography of the film began on June 29, 1998, what would have been the 17th wedding anniversary of Hampton's marriage to Waymer.

Filming took place in Toronto. The project was being called In Your Shoes during that time.

Reception
Variety gave the film a positive review. Whilst noting plot similarities to Freaky Friday, Trading Places and The Parent Trap, as well as character stereotypes, Ray Richmond stated "there is so much to like about the genuinely canny show that all of the other stuff sounds nitpicky and harsh. Under Bogdanovich's sure hand, this is a stylish fantasy that leaves you with a smile."

References

External links
 

1999 television films
1999 films
American football films
American sports comedy films
Films directed by Peter Bogdanovich
Films scored by Terence Blanchard
Disney television films
Walt Disney anthology television series episodes
New Orleans Saints
Body swapping in films
American pregnancy films
1990s pregnancy films
1990s English-language films
1990s American films